Metropolitan Apostolos (Papakonstantinou) (1924 – 28 September 2009)  was the metropolitan bishop of Kilkis from 1991 until his death. He was ordained a deacon in 1950 and a priest in 1954. He was elected and ordained as Bishop of Zakynthos in 1967.

References

1924 births
2009 deaths
Bishops of the Church of Greece
Kilkis (regional unit)